Fort Gaines is a historic fort on Dauphin Island, Alabama, United States. It was named for Edmund Pendleton Gaines. Established in 1821, it is best known for its role in the Battle of Mobile Bay during the American Civil War.

The fort also has the original cannons used in the battle, five pre-Civil War brick buildings in the interior courtyard, operational blacksmith shop and kitchens, tunnel systems to the fortified corner bastions, and similar features. A museum details the history of this period, as well as the French colonial presence beginning in the late 17th century. The fort was partially modernized for the Spanish–American War. It is a tourist destination with tours and historical reenactment events. The site is considered to be one of the nation's best-preserved Civil War era masonry forts and has been nominated for listing as a National Historic Landmark.

Significant masonry damage had been sustained during hurricanes and tropical storms during its lifetime. Though this damage has been largely repaired, the fort continues to be under threat from erosion. The fort sits on the east end of Dauphin Island, only feet from the Gulf of Mexico. Ongoing erosional losses of sand dunes and beach total up to 10 feet per year. For these reasons, the Civil War Preservation Trust placed Fort Gaines on its History Under Siege listing on March 18, 2009. The listing identifies the ten most endangered Civil War battlefields in the United States. Additionally it was placed on the list of America's 11 Most Endangered Historic Places by the National Trust for Historic Preservation in 2011.

Civil War

See also

 History of Mobile, Alabama

Popular culture
Fort Gaines was the setting for one episode of MTV's Fear.

Images

See also

 Battle of Mobile Bay

References

Further reading

External links
 

1821 establishments in Alabama
Alabama in the American Civil War
American Civil War on the National Register of Historic Places
Gaines
Gaines
Gaines
Museums in Mobile County, Alabama
Military and war museums in Alabama
Gaines
National Register of Historic Places in Mobile County, Alabama
Ghost towns in the United States
Ghost towns in North America
Towns in Alabama